Georgina Reilly (born February 12, 1986) is an English/Canadian film and television actress best known to date for her roles in the films Pontypool and This Movie Is Broken, the television series The L.A. Complex and Murdoch Mysteries, and the CBC Radio drama series Trust Inc.

Early years
Reilly was born in Surrey, England, and moved with her family to Toronto, Canada, when she was sixteen. Growing up, Reilly spent many holidays in Canada visiting relatives. She attended and graduated from Havergal College.

Personal life
Reilly is the granddaughter of Canadian musician Tommy Reilly. Her father, David T. Reilly, is a writer and composer, and her mother works in production. Reilly's older brother is a DJ.

She married her Republic of Doyle costar Mark O'Brien on January 6, 2013, after having met on the set of his show in 2011.

Filmography

Film

Television

References

External links

 
 

1986 births
Actresses from Surrey
English film actresses
English television actresses
English radio actresses
Canadian film actresses
Canadian television actresses
Canadian radio actresses
People from Guildford
English emigrants to Canada
Havergal College alumni
Living people
21st-century Canadian actresses